The Victorian Amateur Football Association (VAFA) is the largest senior community Australian rules football competition in Victoria. It consists of seven senior men's and women's divisions ranging from Premier to Division 4.

In addition there are U19's sections and five Thirds sections, primarily made up of either clubs only able to field one team, or clubs from higher sections that can field a third team after their seniors and reserves. The league operates a double promotion and relegation system between sections with various rules dictating which section clubs can play in.

The league's administration base is at Elsternwick Park, a former Victorian Football Association stadium in suburban Elsternwick, Victoria, that was home to the now defunct Brighton Football Club and is now the home base for Old Melburnians Football Club and Elsternwick Football Club. It was redeveloped in 2017 and has a capacity for around 15,000 spectators.

The Association is made up of private school old boys clubs, university clubs and district clubs. No player payments are permitted, however players can be enticed by offers of employment.

History

Metropolitan Junior Football Association (MJFA)
The Victorian Amateur Football Association was founded in 1892 as the Metropolitan Junior Football Association. The foundation clubs were: Alberton; Brighton; Collegians; Footscray District; St Jude's; St Mary's; Toorak-Grosvenor; YMCA.

Metropolitan Amateur Football Association (MAFA)

1912
In 1912 the MJFA became the Metropolitan Amateur Football Association.

Prior to the First World War, apart from its core function of delivering a competition for amateur footballers, the MAFA also provided an (unofficial) second-level competition for the VFL. The VFL Second XVIII competition began in 1919; the MAFA competition was not resumed, post-war, until 1920.

1920
On Monday, 22 March 1920, a meeting of the (then) Metropolitan Amateur Football Association decided to resume the inter-club competition that it had suspended for the duration of World War I at the end of the 1915 season. The MAFA announced that the re-formed competition would be between four of the "pre-war" clubs — namely, Collegians Football Club, South Yarra Amateur Football Club, Elsternwick Football Club, and Melbourne University Football Club (later University Blacks) — and four "new clubs" — namely, Old Melburnians, Old Caulfield Grammarians, Melbourne Swimming Club Football Club and the Teachers’ College Football Club.

Victorian Amateur Football Association (VAFA)
In 1933 it changed its name to the Victorian Amateur Football Association.

Movement in and out of senior competition since inception
From a history of the VAFA

Inter-league and Inter-state games

1925
In June 1925 a MAFA Representative XVIII defeated the South Australian 21.22 to 8.10 at the MCG in the first amateur Interstate representative game.

1948 

Players in the 1948 Perth Carnival included: R. B. Small, K. N. C. Rollanson, G. V. Byrne, C. P. Daley, J. C. Stock, V. G. Miller, E. Jane, W. J. Backhouse, W. T. Taggart, J. P. Sheehan, R. L. Rouse, K. F. Lewis, J. W. Grainier, W. Reynolds’s, N. P. Airmen, G. W. McTaggart, D. B. White, (Deputy Manager) E. L. Macklin, B. F. Judd, V. W. Paxton, M. J. Davidson, D. W. Arnold, (Capt.) G. T. Moore, (Manager) M. K. Fitcher, (Vice-Capt.) A. H. C. Richard’s, E. M.  MacGregor.

1951

The Australian Amateur Jubilee Football Carnival was held in Melbourne in July 1951.

The Victorian team included: J. Kelly (Coach), K. Clarke, G. W. Gibbons, A. T.  Shiel, D. Bills, J.D. Anderson, M.T. Hastie, A. D. Morning, G. Harris. G.T. Moore (Manager), A. E. Parley, W. B. Thomas, M. Mathewson, A. Ferguson, J. Stock, J. B. Jolley, J. Likely, B. F. Judd, W. M. Judd, P. McLaughlin, . Bedford, S. Bottles, D. W. Arnold (Capt.), P. M. Cox (V-Capt.), H. A. Meredith, A. F. Mellors, E. Donaldson.

1954
On 14 June 1954, the Queen's Birthday holiday, a Victorian representative team defeated a South Australian team 12.14 (86) to 10.15 (75) at the Junction Oval. The match was preceded by the Grand Final of a "lightning premiership" that involving sixteen teams playing knock-out matches of two 10 minute halves. Four of the first round matches were played at the Junction Oval, and the other four were played (simultaneously) at the Ross Gregory Oval at the other end of Albert Park Lake. The quarter final, semi final, and the Grand Final matches were all played at the Junction Oval. The sixteen teams involved were:
 Alphington Football Club, Hampton Rovers Football Club, Melbourne High School Old Boys (M.H.S.O.B.), Old Melburnians, and Ormond Amateur Football Club from A Section.
 Brunswick Amateurs Football Club, Caulfield Grammarians Football Club, Coburg Amateurs Football Club, Collegians Football Club, and Ivanhoe Amateur Football Club from B Section.
 Balwyn Football Club, East Malvern Football Club, and Parkside Football Club from C Section.
 Parkdale Football Club from D Section.
 South Melbourne City Football Club, and Preston Amateurs Football Club from E Section.
Parkside (the team that would later go on to have its twenty-ninth consecutive win in the 1954 C Section Grand Final), having beaten Balwyn in the first round, Preston in the quarter finals, and Ivanhoe in the Semi-finals, defeated Alphington in the Grand Final to win the lightning premiership.

1956
In 1956 a VAFA XVIII beat the combined VFL/VFA Amateurs in an Olympic demonstration game, 12.9 (81) to 8.7 (55).

1957
Of some considerable historical significance, the VAFA vs. South Australian Amateur Football League interstate match, played at Olympic Park on 17 June 1957 — which Victoria won 15.9 (99) to 8.3 (51) — was the first ever uninterrupted telecast of a complete Australian rules football game (viz., it was a direct broadcast of the entire four quarters of the match, rather than just the last quarter) .

1971
In 1971 a VAFA Representative side beat a VFA XVIII for the inaugural Victorian Football Cup 23.12 to 19.17.

Growth
The inaugural season of the then MJFA comprised fixtures between 8 teams. By 1922 the association divided into 2 sections of 8. Only 4 years later three sections were established; Section A with 10 clubs and Section B and C with 8 clubs each.

Competition was ceased for the Second World War (as it had after the Great War). Restarting in 1946 with 27 clubs in three sections, by 1947 34 clubs were competing over three sections. 1948 saw 35 clubs spread over four sections. In 1954 the MAFA established a fifth section for its 48 senior clubs.

1960 saw 74 clubs over 7 sections.
A major indicator of the growth and quality of the association led to poaching of VAFA players to the VFL in 1961.

The league then dwindled and lost two sections. Section F was reintroduced in 1971. Section G was introduced in 1986. By 1987 there were 68 clubs over 8 sections. The number of clubs since has been in slight decline, now at 66 over 7 sections.

Premiers
 From the VAFA Website

Current clubs
For the 2022 season, the senior divisions were structured as follows:

Men's Seniors

William Buck Premier

Premier B

Premier C

Division 1

Division 2

Division 3

Division 4

Thirds Only

Currently in Recess

Women's Seniors

William Buck Premier

Premier B

Premier C

Division 1

Division 2

Division 3

Former clubs

See also
Australian rules football in Victoria

References

External links
Official Site
Brief History
VAFA Records and History at Full Points Footy

 
2
Organisations based in Melbourne
Sports leagues established in 1892
1892 establishments in Australia